Paradise Road is a 1997 Australian war film that tells the story of a group of English, American, Dutch and Australian women who are imprisoned by the Japanese in Sumatra during World War II. It was directed by Bruce Beresford and stars Glenn Close as Adrienne Pargiter, (based on Norah Chambers), Frances McDormand as the brash Dr. Verstak, Pauline Collins as missionary Margaret Drummond (based on missionary Margaret Dryburgh), Julianna Margulies as U.S. socialite Topsy Merritt, Jennifer Ehle as British doyenne and model Rosemary Leighton Jones, Cate Blanchett as Australian nurse Susan McCarthy and Elizabeth Spriggs as dowager Imogene Roberts.

Plot
Basing his film on real events, Bruce Beresford tells the story of a vocal orchestra created by the women in a Japanese Internment camp, a classic survivors' tale about women's ability to survive hardship and atrocity through perseverance, solidarity and creativity. The film opens with a dance at Raffles Hotel in Singapore. Wives and husbands, soldiers and socialites are enjoying a night of dancing, libations, and conversation. The scene is happy and carefree, but the film continues to unfold and it soon becomes known that a war is raging right outside the doors. Paradise Road is set during the time of World War II, and the Japanese forces have just attacked Singapore. When a bomb explodes right outside the club, it becomes known that the Japanese have advanced beyond defensive lines. The women and children are immediately collected and carried off by a boat to a safer location. A few hours out, the boat is bombed by Japanese fighter planes and the women must jump over board to save their lives.

Three women, Adrienne Pargiter the wife of a tea planter, Rosemary Leighton-Jones a model and the girlfriend of a Royal Malayan Volunteer, and Susan Macarthy, an Australian nurse, swim their way to shore. The place on which they land is the island of Sumatra. The women are found by a Japanese officer, Captain Tanaka, and ushered to a deserted village. They are then taken to a prison camp in the jungle. The three women are reunited with the rest of the women and children from the boat. At the prison camp, there are women of all nationalities including Dutch, English, Irish, Portuguese, Chinese, and Australian; and they all come from many levels of society. Some of the women are nuns, some are nurses, and some are socialites and mothers. The women are forced to bow to the Japanese officers and its flag. The women must endure torture and hard labour while trying to remain positive and level headed. Many believe the war would end soon and their husbands or soldiers will come looking for them. Nonetheless, the living conditions are brutal, and many face sickness and death. Needless to say, their spirits rapidly flag. Some of the women choose to work in a brothel for Japanese officers for better treatment and decent food.

The women have been at the prison camp for two years now. Adrienne Pargiter, a graduate from the Royal Academy of Music, and Daisy "Margaret" Drummond a missionary, decided to create a vocal orchestra in order to encourage the women. Some of the women fear for their lives because the Japanese officers, especially Sergeant Tomiashi "The Snake", who is made known for his cruelty and abuse, have prohibited any meetings whether religious or social.  The orchestra finally performs for the entire camp, even the officers stop to listen to the vibrant music. However, the music only works as motivation for so long and the women continue to dwindle in numbers. After some time, the women are moved to a new location where they will remain for the duration of the war. The war ends and the women rejoice for their freedom.  The film closes on a scene of the last performance by the vocal orchestra. The vocal orchestra performed more than 30 works from 1943 to 1944. The original scores survived the war and are the basis for the music performed in the film. In 1997, many of the survivors were still alive during the making of the film and contributed to the inspiration for Paradise Road.

Cast  
In credits order:
 Glenn Close as Adrienne Pargiter
 Frances McDormand as Dr. Verstak
 Pauline Collins as Daisy "Margaret" Drummond (based on Margaret Dryburgh)
 Julianna Margulies as Topsy Merritt
 Cate Blanchett as Susan Macarthy
 Jennifer Ehle as Rosemary Leighton-Jones
 Wendy Hughes as Mrs. Dickson
 Johanna ter Steege as Sister Wilhelmina
 Elizabeth Spriggs as Mrs. Roberts
 Pamela Rabe as Mrs. Tippler
 Clyde Kusatsu as Sergeant Tomiashi, 'The Snake'
 Stan Egi as Captain Tanaka
 David Chung as Mr. Tomio
 Sab Shimono as Colonel Hirota
 Penne Hackforth-Jones as Mrs. Pike
 Pauline Chan as Wing
 Lisa Hensley as Edna
 Susie Porter as Oggi
 Anita Hegh as Bett
 Tessa Humphries as Celia Roberts
 Lia Scallon as Mrs. O'Riordan
 Marta Dusseldorp as Helen van Praagh
 Marijke Mann as Mrs. Cronje
 Aden Young as Bill Seary
 Paul Bishop as Dennis Leighton-Jones
 Stephen O'Rourke as William Pargiter
 Vincent Ball as Mr. Dickson
 Nicholas Hammond as Marty Merritt
 Steven Grives as Westmacott
 Robert Grubb as Colonel Downes
 Arthur Dignam as Mr. Pike
 Tanya Bird as Siobhan O'Riordan
 Alwine Seinen as Millie
 Kitty Clignett as Sister Anna
 Shira Van Essen as Antoinette van Praagh
 Yoshi Adachi as Mr. Moto
 Mitsu Sato as Rags
 Taka Nagano as Boris
 Koji Sasaki as Lefty
 Julie Anthony as Female Vocalist
 Geoffrey Ogden-Brown as Band Leader
 Jason Arden as Edgar
 Kristine McAlister as Matron Heffernan
 Jesse Rosenfeld as Danny Tippler
 Phillip Stork as Michael Tippler
 John Elcock as Seaman Francis
 Hamish Urquhart as Aran O'Riordan
 Jemal Blattner as Older Aran O'Riordan
 John Proper as Captain Murchison
 Shigenori Ito as Dr. Mizushima
 Geoff O'Halloran as  	Sailor
 Chi Yuen Lee as Chinese Man
 Ping Pan as Chinese Man

Production
The story is based on the testimony of Betty Jeffrey, as written in her 1954 book White Coolies.  The 1965 book Song of Survival by Helen Colijn (granddaughter of Hendrikus Colijn), another camp survivor, is not listed in the film's credits as being a source for this film, although Colijn is thanked for her help in the credits.

According to the media information kit for the film, Martin Meader and David Giles researched the story from 1991 and met with survivors from the camp and choir. Meader and Giles wrote the original screenplay, which was titled "A Voice Cries Out". Graeme Rattigan then joined Meader and Giles and together the three travelled the world, raising $8.275 million for the film. They met Beresford in London and he immediately became interested in the project. Together with Village Roadshow, Beresford took over the film, re-wrote the script and renamed the project Paradise Road.

Beresford and producer Sue Milliken then did their own research of the story for over more than two years, by reading books and unpublished diaries on the subject and by interviewing survivors. Meader and Giles got a "Story by" credit, and with Rattigan, they all received a Co-Executive Producer Credit. Their company, Planet Pictures, received an "In Association With" credit.

The film represents an alternative take on female imprisonment by the Japanese during World War II compared with BBC's dramatic offering from the early 1980s, Tenko.  Some criticism of the film's historical accuracy is discussed in an article by Professor Hank Nelson.

Fox provided $19 million of the budget with $6 million coming from Singapore businessman Andrew Yap.

The role of Dr Verstak was originally offered to Anjelica Huston, who demanded more profit share than the filmmakers were willing to give, so Frances McDormand was cast instead. The part of Margaret Drummond was to be played by Jean Simmons but she had to withdraw due to illness; the studio wanted Joan Plowright but she accepted another offer and Pauline Collins wound up being cast. Fox were reluctant to cast Cate Blanchett in the lead as she was relatively unknown at the time but Beresford insisted.

Production took place in Marrickville (Sydney), Singapore, Port Douglas and Penang.

Historical context
During World War II, many women became prisoners of war and faced a twenty to fifty percent death rate in Japanese prison camps. However, many women prisoners of war stories have been overlooked, with the exception of the women POWs of Sumatra. Thousands of British and Dutch colonists made the East Indies their home. Singapore was the most popular living option with the Raffles Hotel, shops, and beautiful houses, which attracted many soldiers and their wives. The Japanese armed forces attacked Pearl Harbor, Malaysia, Singapore and Hong Kong on 7 December 1941. Europeans held the Japanese forces to an inferior level and put their trust in the British navy that guarded Singapore. But the Japanese advanced on British military lines, captured the British airfield, and dropped bombs on the city, which led to a retreat by the British forces. On 15 February 1942 the Japanese took Singapore.

Due to the belief that the city was safe, many women and children had remained in Singapore when the city was attacked. The inhabitants of the city, including women and children, ran to board ships to flee the island. Some of these ships housed the women POWs of Sumatra. The "Vyner Brooke" contained 65 nurses from the Australian Army Nursing Service. It reached the Banka Strait before the Japanese attacked and released bombs over the ship. The women and children were forced to jump overboard to save their lives, but the Japanese continued to fire on the women in the water.

The survivors swam ashore to Banka Island. One of the Australian nurses suggested the women and children to head toward a village on the island while the nurses remained on the beach to care for the men's wounds. When the Japanese discovered them, the men were rounded up and twenty-two of the nurses were forced back into the water where they were shot by the soldiers. Only Vivian Bullwinkel survived after the soldiers opened fire. Bullwinkel later found the rest of the nurses that survived the sinking of the ship. The women were transferred from Banka Island to Sumatra. Some survived the multiple voyages back and forth between the islands for three and a half years. The women were living in the Sumatra prison camp when the war ended and a rescue came for the survivors.

Reception
On the review aggregator website Rotten Tomatoes, the film has a 43% approval rating, based on 23 reviews, with an average rating of 5.9/10. On Metacritic, the film received a weighted average score of 48 out of 100, based on 18 critics, indicating "mixed or average reviews". Audiences polled by CinemaScore gave the film an average grade of "A−" on an A+ to F scale.

The film opened 11 April 1997 on 9 screens in the United States and Canada and grossed $62,518 for the weekend. It went on to gross $2,007,100. It opened in Australia on 5 June 1997 on 85 screens and grossed $692,788 for the week, placing fifth at the Australian box office. It went on to gross A$2,970,653.

See also
 Tenko
 Cinema of Australia

References

Bibliography
Milliken, Sue Selective Memory: My Life in Film

External links
 
 
 Paradise Road at the National Film and Sound Archive
 New York Times review
 Roger Ebert review
Paradise Road at Oz Movies

1997 films
Pacific War films
World War II prisoner of war films
Australian drama films
Fox Searchlight Pictures films
Films directed by Bruce Beresford
War films based on actual events
Films set in Indonesia
1997 drama films
Women in prison films
Japan in non-Japanese culture